Latin Mass Society is a name used by various associations that promote the Tridentine Mass among Catholics, including:

 Latin Mass Society of England and Wales
 Latin Mass Society of Ireland

See also 
 Traditionalist Catholicism
 Liturgical use of Latin